The Royal Newfoundland Constabulary (RNC) is the provincial police service for the province of Newfoundland and Labrador.

The Royal Newfoundland Constabulary is one of three provincial police forces in Canada, alongside the Ontario Provincial Police and the Sûreté du Québec. Uniquely, the responsibility policing in Newfoundland and Labrador is not granted to municipalities — in Ontario and Quebec, the provincial police provide frontline police services only to extraordinarily small communities or at the request of a municipal council; in Newfoundland and Labrador, the Constabulary operates in all communities by default. Since 1949, the Royal Canadian Mounted Police have provided police services in the province's rural interior, in place of the RNC.

History
The first police constables in Newfoundland and Labrador were appointed by Governor Henry Osborn to six separate judicial districts in 1729. In the 19th century, the RNC was modeled after the Royal Irish Constabulary with the secondment in 1844 of Timothy Mitchell to be Inspector General. The administration of police services was centralized under one Inspector and General Superintendent of Police in 1853. Legislation governing the Newfoundland Constabulary was passed by the House of Assembly in 1871.

In January 1909, John J. Sullivan became the first Newfoundland-born police chief of the Constabulary, a post he held until September 1917.

In 1935, the Newfoundland Commission of Government established the Newfoundland Ranger Force, a police service modelled on the Royal Canadian Mounted Police, to serve rural parts of Newfoundland and Labrador. The Ranger Force replaced the Newfoundland Constabulary outside of the Avalon Peninsula, the Humber Arm (and in particular, the four communities that make up present-day Corner Brook), Grand Falls, and other built-up communities on the island.

During World War II, the Newfoundland Constabulary provided police and investigative services to the foreign militaries stationed at St. John's, famously investigating the 1942 Knights of Columbus Hostel fire, a fatal structure fire believed to have been an arson attack.

After Newfoundland and Labrador joined Canada in 1949, the Ranger Force was disbanded and replaced by the Royal Canadian Mounted Police, which also replaced the Newfoundland Constabulary outside of the City of St. John's.

In 1979, Queen Elizabeth II of Canada conferred a royal patronage on the Newfoundland Constabulary in recognition of its long history of service to Newfoundland and Labrador. The force subsequently changed its name to the Royal Newfoundland Constabulary.

The first women were sworn-in as constables in 1980.

Between 1981 and 1986, the Royal Newfoundland Constabulary gradually re-expanded, replacing the RCMP in the northeast Avalon Region, parts of Labrador, and Corner Brook.

In 1998, RNC officers were authorized to begin carrying their handguns on their belt. Previously, officers were required to keep their firearms locked in the trunk of their car unless they were needed.

On May 3, 2005, the RNC made a formal exchange of colours with the Garda Síochána, one of two successor forces to the Royal Irish Constabulary. The exchange of colours was to mark the historic links between policing in Newfoundland and Ireland.

In 2019, the force hired its first Black police officers, Paul Growns and Jevaughn Coley.

In 2022, the Constabulary sparked controversy after it was revealed that a constable facing four domestic violence-related charges was granted the Chief of Police's Commendation, which recognizes "distinguished, commendable act of police duty or outstanding contribution to the RNC," during her criminal trial.

Operations
The Royal Newfoundland Constabulary operates out of five police stations, referred to as regional offices or detachments:
 St. John's - serves as the Constabulary's headquarters
 Conception Bay South - Detachment (of the St. John's Regional Office)
 Churchill Falls - Regional Office
 Corner Brook - Regional Office
 Labrador City - Detachment (of the Churchill Falls Regional Office)

The Constabulary also maintains a satellite office of the St. John's Regional Office in Mount Pearl.

Organizational structure

Specialized units
The Royal Newfoundland Constabulary maintains several specialized investigative and response units, including a tactical response team, criminal and general investigations units, a police dogs unit, a marine unit, a public order unit, and a collision reconstruction team.

Mounted unit
The RNC has operated a mounted unit since 1873.

The current horse-mounted team was created in 2003, replacing a voluntary unit. The unit's history can be traced back to three earlier units, the Newfoundland Constabulary Mounted Force 1873-1894, New Fire Brigade Mounted Force 1895-1922, and Newfoundland Constabulary 1922-1951.

The unit has four Percheron horses:

 Dr. Rich
 Townshend
 Fraize
 Dobbin

Fleet
The Royal Newfoundland Constabulary maintains a fleet of vehicles of models from several major automakers, such as models including but not limited to the following:

 Other vehicles are commissioned for special purposes, such as the Tactics and Rescue Unit (TRU), Dog Services, Mounted Unit Transport, and Evidence Collection.
 29-foot Mercury Rigid Hull Inflatable Boat (RHIB) with twin 200HP engines
 The RNC has no helicopters, and instead relies on the RCMP to provide police helicopter services.

Equipment
As a result of the recommendations of the Select Committee on the Arming Policy of the RNC, members on operational duty were permitted to wear sidearms starting 14 June 1998. Previously, members were required to keep all firearms secured in the trunk of the police cruiser and were only deployed with permission from the Chief.

See also
 Custodian helmet
 List of Canadian organizations with royal patronage
 Royal Canadian Mounted Police
 Royal Irish Constabulary
 Newfoundland Ranger Force—police force that patrolled less populated areas of Newfoundland from 1935 until 1949.

References

External links 

 
 Oral history collection related to Ferryland Constabulary officers

Government agencies established in 1841
Law enforcement agencies of Newfoundland and Labrador
Organizations based in Canada with royal patronage
1840s establishments in Newfoundland
1841 establishments in North America
Protective security units